The Iowa Civil Rights Commission is the state agency that enforces the Iowa Civil Rights Act of 1965, Iowa's anti-discrimination law.

Commissioners

Interim Executive director 
Charles Hill

Current commissioners 
Marcelena Ordaz - Chairperson

Patricia Lipski - Vice-Chairperson

Sam Kooiker - Commissioner 

Dennis Mandsager - Commissioner

Holly White - Commissioner

Background 
The concept for the Iowa Civil Rights Commission was first introduced in 1964 in a law review article published by Arthur E. Bonfield.
The idea led to the passage of the Iowa Civil Rights Act, which formally created the commission. The Iowa Civil Rights Act of 1965 prohibits discrimination in the areas of employment, housing, credit, public accommodations and education. Discrimination, or different treatment, is illegal if based on race, color, creed, national origin, religion, sex, sexual orientation, gender identity, pregnancy, physical disability, mental disability, age (in employment and credit), familial status (in housing and credit) or marital status (in credit). In addition, it is illegal to retaliate for discrimination complaint, participating in an investigation of a discrimination complaint, or having opposed discriminatory conduct.

Cooperation with local and federal agencies 
Under the Iowa Civil Rights Act, cities with a population over 29,000 must have a local commission. The Commission coordinates its investigative efforts with these local commissions. In addition, the Commission will also partner with the local commissions to for educational outreach events to the public. The Iowa Civil Rights Commission also cooperates with federal anti-discrimination agencies. The Equal Employment Opportunity Commission (EEOC) has the designated the Iowa Civil Rights Commission as the Fair Employment Practices Agency (FEPA) for Iowa. As a FEPA, the Commission has a worksharing agreement with the EEOC. Under this agreement, the Commission investigates complaints of employment discrimination in Iowa that are cross-filed with both the Commission and the EEOC. The Iowa Civil Rights Commission also is the state agency for Iowa that participates in the U.S. Department of Housing and Urban Development's Fair Housing Assistance Program (FHAP). Under this program, the Commission investigates and enforces complaints of housing discrimination under the Fair Housing Act.

Criticism

Opposition to LGBTQ Protections 
In 1983, the Iowa Civil Rights Commission was sued for failing to investigate the civil rights charge of a transgender women in the case of Sommers v. ICRC, stating it had a lack of jurisdiction.  The Iowa Supreme Court affirmed the Iowa Civil Rights Commission's determination that gender identity was not included under the protected characteristic of sex in chapter 601A and there had been no intent by legislature to expand the traditional meaning of sex . The commission was found to be not unreasonable, arbitrary, or capricious in denying jurisdiction. Effective July 1, 2007, the Iowa Civil Rights Act (Iowa Code Chapter 216) was expanded to add sexual orientation and gender identity to the list of protected classes, making it illegal in Iowa to discriminate against a person because of his/her sexual orientation or gender identity. On June 15, 2020, the Supreme Court delivered its landmark ruling in Altitude Express, Inc. v. Zarda that the term 'sex' as described in the Civil Rights Act of 1964, encompassed workers who identified as members of the LGBTQ community, aligning federal civil rights protections with protections already available under Iowa State law.

Ineffectiveness of the Iowa Civil Rights Commission  
On average, more than half of the charges reviewed by the Iowa Civil Rights Commission are closed administratively, without the commencement of a formal investigation. The commission has recently come under criticism for employing a charge-processing mechanism that is unconstitutional and rigs the process in favor of business interests. In a national ranking done of Civil Rights agencies, the ICRC was ranked among the worst in the nation with a probable cause rate of 1.20%. The Iowa Civil Rights Commission has also attracted notoriety for overseeing one of the nations best labor markets  but also one of the most racially segregated. In 2020, the Iowa Civil Rights Commission was sued in Federal Court under Title VI for its use of federal funds towards an investigatory process that contributes to discrimination and harassment within the state rather than its eradication.

Historical Efficacy of the Iowa Civil Rights Commission

2018-2019 Civil Rights Enforcement Outcomes

2019-2020 Civil Rights Enforcement Outcomes

References

Government of Iowa
State agencies of Iowa